John McCaw (4 October 1849 – 10 April 1930) was a New Zealand farm manager, farmer and land valuer. He was born in Morriston, Ayrshire, Scotland, on 4 October 1849.

References

1849 births
1930 deaths
New Zealand farmers
People from South Ayrshire
Scottish emigrants to New Zealand